The Starokostiantyniv Castle is a Volhynian castle built at the confluence of the Sluch and Ikopot' rivers by Prince Konstanty Wasyl Ostrogski in the 1560s. 

The castle of Starokostiantyniv withstood many attacks by the Turks and the Crimean Tatars but was successfully stormed by the rebellious Cossacks in 1648. The castle played an important part in Ukraine's struggle for independence when Starokostiantyniv was visited by such national leaders as Bohdan Khmelnytsky and Petro Doroshenko. 

The grounds still contain a fortified residence and a small church. The latter is dedicated to the Holy Trinity and has a single apse. A sacristy building adjoins it from the side of the river. The wall had five towers of which little remains. It used to be encircled by 6-metre-high earthen ramparts and a moat traversed by a drawbridge.

Sources 
  Памятники градостроительства и архитектуры Украинской ССР. — Киев: Будивельник, 1983—1986. — Том 4. — C. 225-6.

External links 
 

 Lubomyr Wynar. Ostrozky in the Encyclopedia of Ukraine, vol. 3 (1993)

References 

Buildings and structures in Khmelnytskyi Oblast
Castles in Ukraine
Houses completed in the 16th century
Ostrogski family